Herman Earl Sayger (January 3, 1895 – January 24, 1970) was an American football and basketball coach. He served as the head football coach at Heidelberg College in 1917 and from 1924 to 1929.

Sayger died on January 24, 1970, at Bedford County Memorial Hospital in New Bedford, Pennsylvania.

Heidelberg has named the gymnasium building in his honor.

Head coaching record

College football

References

1895 births
1970 deaths
Akron Zips football coaches
American football quarterbacks
Basketball coaches from Arkansas
Heidelberg Student Princes athletic directors
Heidelberg Student Princes football coaches
Heidelberg Student Princes football players
Heidelberg Student Princes men's basketball coaches
High school football coaches in Ohio
People from Jonesboro, Arkansas